Life force or lifeforce may refer to:

 Spirit (vital essence), in folk belief, the vital principle or animating force within all living things
 Vitality, ability to live or exist
 Vitalism, the belief in the existence of vital energy
 Energy (esotericism), a concept in spirituality and alternative medicine
 Prana, the Sanskrit word for "life force" or "vital principle"
 Qi, or chi, an active principle forming part of any living thing (translated as "natural energy", "life force", or "energy flow")
 Élan vital (roughly translated as "vital impetus" or "vital force"), a philosophical term coined by Henri Bergson in 1907 
 Vijñāna (translated as "consciousness," "life force", "mind" or "discernment")

Art and entertainment 
 Life Force (album), a 1967 album by American saxophonist Eric Kloss
 Lifeforce (film), a 1985 science fiction-horror film
 Life Force (video game), an alternate version of the 1986 video game Salamander
 A Life Force, a 1988 graphic novel by Will Eisner
 Life Force (sculpture), a 1992 sculpture at Columbia University, New York City
 Life Force, a 1992 novel by Fay Weldon
 Lifeforce Records, a 1995 record label
 Life Force (TV series), a 2000 British science fiction television series
 LifeForce, a fictional group of traveling doctors in Africa, within the 2004 Hong Kong television series The Last Breakthrough